Frederick Johnstone may refer to:

 Sir Frederick Johnstone, 7th Baronet (1810–1841), MP for Weymouth and Melcombe Regis
 Sir Frederick Johnstone, 8th Baronet (1841–1913), English racehorse owner and politician

See also
Frederick Johnston (disambiguation)